Q School 2021 – Event 3 was the third, and final, qualifying tournament for the 2021–22 snooker season. It took place from 8 to 13 June 2021 at the Ponds Forge International Sports Centre in Sheffield, England.

Format 
The draw was made on 18 May 2021, with players seeded for the first time in the tournament's history. The seeded players were those that dropped off the tour at the end of the 2020–21 season, or those who ranked highly in 2020 Q School. The event was played in a knockout system with the winner of each section earning a two-year tour card to play on the main tour for the 2021–22 and 2022–23 seasons. All matches were the best-of-seven frames.

Main draw

Section 1 
Round 1

Section 2 
Round 1

Section 3 
Round 1

Section 4 
Round 1

Century breaks 
Total: 21

140  Alex Taubman
132, 110  Mateusz Baranowski
128  Duane Jones
123  Sam Baird
120, 120  Brian Cini
119  Kuldesh Johal
119  George Pragnell
118  Ben Mertens
115  Gary Challis
115  Anton Kazakov
112, 106  Ian Burns
112  James Cahill
111  Mitchell Mann
110  Leo Fernandez
107  Billy Castle
103  Ross Muir
103  Luke Simmonds
100  Bai Langning

References

Snooker competitions in England
Q School (snooker)
2021 in snooker